Slavomir Gvozdenovici (born 10 March 1953) is a Romanian and Serbian writer, poet, politician, and a social and public worker of the Serbian minority in Romania.

Biography 
He was born on 10 March 1953 in Belobreșca, Caraș-Severin County, Romania. He attended middle school in Belobreșca, and later high school in the Serbian section at Lyceum No. 1 in Timisoara. In 1972, he enrolled at the Faculty of Philology, Department of Serbian Language and Literature in Bucharest at the University of Bucharest. After graduating from the university in 1976, he worked as a teacher in the elementary school in Liubcova, then in the elementary school in Belobreşca and as an editor of the Timisoara newspaper "Banatske novine" (1983–1985). Since 1996, he has been teaching Serbian literature at the Department of Serbian Language and Literature at the Western University in Timisoara. He specialized in summer courses and seminars in Zagreb, Dubrovnik, Belgrade, Priština and Novi Sad. In 2000, he defended his doctoral dissertation Language and Style in the Poetry of Vasko Popa at the University of Bucharest. He has been the editor-in-chief of the Literary Life magazine since 1985 in Timisoara. He published 30 books of poetry, prepared a dozen anthologies of Serbian literature, and his poetry is represented in dozens of Serbian, Romanian and European anthologies, as well as in Serbian textbooks. He translates Serbian and Romanian poetry, and his works have been translated into a dozen languages. He is a member of the Writers Union of Romania, the Association of Writers of Republika Srpska, the Writers' Association of Vojvodina and an honorary member of the Association of Writers of Serbia. He has been a research associate of Matica srpska since 1995 and a co-founder of "Vuk's endowment".

Politics 
He is one of the founders of the Union of Serbs of Romania and its president from 2004 to 2012. Thanks to his effort the Serbian Home was built in the settlement of Iosefin in Timisoara, where the premises of the Union of Serbs of Romania, the offices of the magazines "Nasa reč" and "Književni život" and the newspaper "Novi timišvarski vesnik" are located. He personally organized 5 large and 20 smaller cultural events, which became a tradition. He was a member of the Chamber of Deputies of Romania from 1992 to 2008, and was re-elected in 2012. In 2010, he was elected the first President of the Assembly of the Diaspora and the Serbs in the region.

Awards 
He has won several important literary awards in Romania and Serbia. At the International Meeting of Balkan Writers in Bor in 1988, he won the "Bor Grumen", the Special Jury Charter of the "Branko Miljković" Award in 1989 for the work Underlining the Line, the "Šušnjar" Award of the Serbian Writers' Association in 1995 for the House with Fire and Ice, Award of the Timisoara Branch of the Writers' Union of Romania in 1995 for the Word and Light, the Serbian Orthodox Church award at the 4th Yugoslav Children's Poetry Festival in 1997. National Award of the Writers' Union of Romania for the work And, award and cross "Arsenije Čarnojević" of the Ministry of Diaspora and the Association of Writers of Serbia, award "Poetic Success" 2012 from the Literary Society of Kosovo and Metohija at the international cultural event "Sokolica 2012" and the international award "Branko Radičević" of Branko's Circle 2013 for the overall poetic and creative opus.

On the occasion of marking the Statehood Day in the Presidency of the Republic of Serbia at a ceremony on 15 February 2016, the President of Serbia, Tomislav Nikolić, presented Slavomir Gvozdenović with the Gold Medal of Merit – decoration for outstanding contribution in public and cultural activities, as well as for developing cooperation and friendly relations. Serbia and Romania.

Bibliography 

 Book and a little fire, Bucharest, 1975.
 Songs before dawn, Timisoara, 1977. 
 Wing Defense, Bucharest, 1978
 Lyrics, Bucharest, 1981.
 Clear Opening of the Stone, Bucharest, 1983 
 Heroism with Words, Bucharest, 1986.
 Textbook on the Vidar House, Bucharest, 1988
 Underlining, Belgrade, 1988.
 Weeping Stone, Bucharest, 1990
 Serbian Prayer in Timisoara, Novi Sad, 1991. 
 Word and Light, Timisoara, 1994. 
 In the House with Fire and Ice, Belgrade, 1995.
 Birth of an Ancestor, Timisoara, 1997
 And, Timisoara, 1999. 
 Crnjanski in Timisoara, Belgrade, 2002 
 Fear in a Trap, Timisoara, 2003 
 America, Chicago and Vidovdan, Timisoara, 2003.
 A Terrible Story from Klisura, Belgrade, 2005.
 Alexandrian Schools, Smederevo, 2005
 How much Kosovo in me, Timisoara, 2007

See also 

 Union of Serbs of Romania
 Serbs of Romania

References

External links 

 Књижевни преглед – Славомир Гвозденовић (in Serbian)
 Uniunea Scriitorilor din România – Filiala Timișoara: Gvozdenovici, Slavomir (in Romanian)
 Camera deputatilor: Slavomir Gvozdenovici (in Romanian)

1953 births
Living people
People from Caraș-Severin County
Serbian male writers
Serbian male poets
Romanian writers
Romanian poets
Romanian politicians of Serbian descent
University of Bucharest alumni
Members of the Chamber of Deputies (Romania)
Serbian writers